Danny Lim (born 1944) is an Australian activist and former politician. He is known for wearing political protest signs on a sandwich board.

Early life
In 1963 Lim moved from Malaysia to Australia, where he began work as an electrical technician.

Political career

Local government (2008–2012)
In 2008, Lim was elected to the Strathfield Council as the lead candidate for an independent ticket, which received 13% of the vote. Lim ran on the policy of "openness, transparency, accountability and morality" in the council, and refused to get paid for his time in office.

State and Federal campaigns
During the 2016 Federal election, Lim ran for the Australian Senate and received 0.01% of the vote in New South Wales. He also ran as an Independent for the Legislative Council in the 2019 New South Wales election, gaining 644 votes (0.01%).

Film and music 
Lim was a background actor in the movie Three Thousand Years of Longing. He played a storyteller, with his dog Smarty, attempting to squash the bloodlust of a tyrannical ruler.

Lim features on the album cover of Sticky Fingers Lekkerboy album.

Legal issues

Offensive language court case
In 2015, Lim was fined $500 for offensive conduct after publicly wearing a sign which labelled the then Prime Minister of Australia Tony Abbott a 'Cunt'. A GoFundMe campaign by supporters raised enough money to cover the fine within less than an hour. The court ruled that the word 'cunt' is not always offensive when said in public compared to countries like the United States and that the fine would have constricted his right to political communication implied in the Constitution. Due to this ruling, he was not fined. The case was seen by law professor Luke McNamara as a step towards protecting civil liberties.

Arrest at Barangaroo
Lim was arrested for offensive behaviour at Barangaroo in January 2019. This was due to a sign which included the word 'CVNT' which was previously ruled by the courts as legal. He has since commenced legal action against the charge and the police officers who arrested him. A rally was held to protest the arrest which was reportedly attended by approximately 300 people. The case was later dismissed on 30 August 2019.

Incident at the Queen Victoria Building, Sydney
On 22 November 2022, he sustained injuries during an arrest in the Queen Victoria Building, leaving him hospitalised. This arrest was later discontinued. On 24 November 2022, he was released from St Vincent's Hospital with "a plan in place for ongoing monitoring" after suffering bleeding on the brain.

References

1944 births
Living people
People from Sydney
New South Wales local councillors